The 2022 Damallsvenskan was the 35th season of the Swedish women's association football top division, Damallsvenskan. The league began on 26 March 2022, and ended on 5 November 2022.

IF Brommapojkarna, IFK Kalmar and Umeå IK were new teams for this season.

Teams 

Notes:
a According to each club information page previously available at the Swedish Football Association website for Damallsvenskan, unless otherwise noted. Since May 2018 this is no longer present. Numbers were usually lower than official stadium numbers.
b According to Kristianstads DFF's history web page.

Standings

Results

Relegation play-offs
The 12th-placed team of Damallsvenskan will meet the third-placed team from 2022 Elitettan in a two-legged tie on a home-and-away basis with the team from Damallsvenskan finishing at home.

Brommapojkarna won 4–1 on aggregate and will remain in Damallsvenskan for the 2023 season.

Positions by Round
The table lists the positions of teams after each week of matches. In order to preserve chronological progress, any matches moved from their original game round are not included in the round at which they were originally scheduled, but added to the full round they were played immediately afterwards. For example, if a match is scheduled for round 13, but then postponed and played between rounds 16 and 17, it will be added to the standings for round 16.

Results by round

Player statistics

Top scorers

Top assists

Hat-tricks

Notes
4 Player scored 4 goals(H) – Home team(A) – Away team

Clean sheets

Discipline

Player
 Most yellow cards: 6
 Olga Ahtinen (Linköping)
 Olivia Holm (Umeå)
 Stina Lennartsson (Linköping)
 Agnes Nyberg (AIK)

 Most red cards: 3
 Matilda Plan (Eskilstuna)

Club
 Most yellow cards: 38
AIK

 Most red cards: 3
Eskilstuna

References

External links 
 Season at soccerway.com
 Season at SvFF

Damallsvenskan seasons
Sweden
Sweden
2022 in Swedish association football leagues
2022 in Swedish women's football